Principia may refer to:

 Philosophiæ Naturalis Principia Mathematica, Isaac Newton's three-volume work about his laws of motion and universal gravitation
 Principia ( "primary buildings"), the headquarters at the center of Roman forts
 The Principia, an educational institution for Christian Scientists in the St. Louis, Missouri, area
 Principia College, a private four-year college in Elsah, Illinois 
 Principia School, a school from early childhood to high school in the St. Louis, Missouri, area
 Principia (alga), a stem-group coralline alga
 Principia, the former name of Zope, the "Z Object Publishing Environment"
 2653 Principia, an asteroid named after Newton's work
 The Principia (book), by Emanuel Swedenborg
 Principia Mathematica, a three-volume work on the foundations of mathematics by Bertrand Russell and Alfred North Whitehead
 Principia Ethica, a book on ethics by G. E. Moore
 Principia Discordia, a Discordian religious text by Greg Hill (Malaclypse the Younger) and Kerry Wendell Thornley (Lord Omar Khayyam Ravenhurst)
 Principia, astronaut Tim Peake's mission as part of the Expedition 46 crew of the International Space Station
 "Principia" (Agents of S.H.I.E.L.D.), season 5 episode 13 of Marvel's Agents of S.H.I.E.L.D.''